William Lee Davidson Ewing (August 31, 1795 – March 25, 1846) was a politician from Illinois who served partial terms as the fifth governor of the state and as U.S. Senator.

Biography 
Ewing was born in Paris, Kentucky on August 31, 1795, and practiced law in Shawneetown, Illinois. James Monroe appointed him to be a land office receiver in Vandalia in 1820.

He married Caroline L. Berry on May 3, 1827.

He served as a Colonel of the "Spy Battalion" during the Black Hawk War.  In 1830, he was elected to serve in the state House of Representatives as Speaker.  He had previously been the clerk of the House.  From 1832 to 1834, he was a State Senator, serving as President pro tempore of the State Senate in 1832.  In 1833, he was also named acting Lieutenant Governor of Illinois and served as Governor of Illinois for fourteen days in 1834, the shortest gubernatorial term in Illinois history.

Upon the death of Elias Kane in 1835, Ewing was appointed by Joseph Duncan to serve out the rest of Kane's term in the U.S. Senate. In 1838 he was appointed Commissioner to adjust the claims of mixed-bloods and traders at Fort Snelling for the Dakota under the 1837 Dakota treaty. His re-election campaign was unsuccessful and he returned to the Illinois State House, becoming Speaker of the House again.

He died at his home in Springfield, Illinois on March 25, 1846.

References

External links 
 Illinois 2005-2006 Blue Book

1795 births
1846 deaths
People from Paris, Kentucky
American people of Scottish descent
Jacksonian United States senators from Illinois
Democratic Party United States senators from Illinois
Democratic Party governors of Illinois
Jacksonian state governors of the United States
Lieutenant Governors of Illinois
Speakers of the Illinois House of Representatives
Democratic Party members of the Illinois House of Representatives
Democratic Party Illinois state senators
Auditors of Public Accounts of Illinois
People from Shawneetown, Illinois
Burials at Oak Ridge Cemetery